Jean-Louis Ricci (22 February 1944 – 27 February 2001) was a French racing driver.

Le Mans

References

1944 births
2001 deaths
French racing drivers
24 Hours of Le Mans drivers
World Sportscar Championship drivers

Team Joest drivers